Eynesil is a town and a district of Giresun Province on the Black Sea coast of Turkey, east of the city of Giresun, towards Trabzon. The population was 7,505 in 2010.

Geography
This is a low-lying coastal strip with steep hills behind. The views are breathtaking but life is hard in the hill country, while hazelnuts and tea are grown in the lower land near the coast, along with vegetables and a cow or two in the family garden. Fishing is another source of income although the harbour at Eynesil is small and limiting. The only industry is tea-processing and Eynesil is therefore not a wealthy district and many people have migrated away to jobs in Turkey's larger cities or abroad.

History

Antiquity
The history of the area dates back to the Hittites in 1500BC, followed by the Phrygians in 1200BC. The Ancient Greeks arrived in 765 BC and in 670BC a colony of the Aegean Greek community of Miletos was founded, one of a chain of 90 trading posts along the Black Sea coast. By 520 BC Eynesil was in the territory of the Satrap of Pontus, a territory of the Persian Empire. This was succeeded by the Roman Empire and the Byzantines and in 1204 the Empire of Trebizond, a rump-Byzantine state that lasted until it was overthrown by Sultan Mehmet II of the Ottoman Empire in 1461.

During the medieval period one of the most important guardians of the coastal road connecting Trabzon to Samsun was the large Byzantine garrison fort located about 3 kilometers east of modern town of Eynesil.  An archaeological and historical assessment of this site as well as a scaled plan were published in 1985.  The impressive circuit walls and defenses create two separate baileys with the remains of numerous rooms.  The site briefly served as a Russian military depot and lighthouse (1877–78) during the Russo-Turkish War.  Today it has become a popular tourist attraction.

The Turkish era
In December 1461 Eynesil became part of the Ottoman Empire, and the first Turkish people to move into the area were the Chepni, followers of Haji Bektash Veli and therefore responsible for the strength of the Alevi community in Eynesil.

References

External links
Note: follow resimler in Turkish language websites for photographs of the area:
  Eynesilin Vizyonu
  the district governorate
  local information
  Photographic survey and plan of Eynesil Castle

Populated places in Giresun Province
Populated coastal places in Turkey
Districts of Giresun Province
Towns in Turkey